The Costa Rica 2000 Census was undertaken by the National Institute of Statistics and Census (Instituto Nacional de Estadística y Censos (INEC)).

Description
According to this Census, Costa Rica had 3,810,179 inhabitants in 2000, a population density of 74.6/km², and 59% of the people lived in urban areas.

Results by canton

References

Censuses in Costa Rica
2000 in Costa Rica
2000 censuses